Lakshmivijayam is a 1976 Indian Malayalam film, directed by K. P. Kumaran and produced by A. G. Abraham. The film stars Sukumaran, Alummoodan, Baby Jayashanthi and Rani Chandra in the lead roles. The film has musical score by Shyam.

Cast
Sukumaran 
Alummoodan 
Baby Jayashanthi
Rani Chandra

Soundtrack
The music was composed by Shyam and the lyrics were written by Mullanezhi.

References

External links
 

1976 films
1970s Malayalam-language films